The 1979 Fenland District Council election took place on 3 May 1979 to elect members of Fenland District Council in the Isle of Ely, Cambridgeshire, England. This was on the same day as the 1979 General Election and other local elections however the town and the parish council elections were pushed back to 24 May 1979 and may well have affected both sets of local elections. Despite a net loss of 3 seats the Conservatives retained overall control of the council. Sitting town mayors and deputy mayors were particularly unsuccessful, in Wisbech Labour mayor Charles Bowden and his conservative deputy Feodor Rikovski failed to win seats and in March Labour mayor Don Dagless lost his seat. The Liberals gained two seats in Wisbech.
1983 Fenland District Council election is next election.

1979 Fenland District Council elections

Ward results
(* denotes sitting councillor)

References

Fenland
Fenland District Council elections
District councils of the United Kingdom